The Green Swamp is a 1916 silent drama starring Bessie Barriscale and written by C. Gardner Sullivan.

Plot summary
The film centers on Magery Allison (played by Bessie Barriscale) and her husband, Dr. Ward Allison (played by Bruce McRae). Jealous over her husband's friendship with his female patients, Mrs. Allison fails to deliver a message from a patient that nearly results in the death of the patient's child.  Mrs. Allison pleads for forgiveness.  On learning that she is pregnant, Dr. Allison does forgive her.  However, the cycle of jealousy repeats itself.

Cast
 Bessie Barriscale - Margery Allison
 Bruce McRae - Dr. Ward Allison
 J. Barney Sherry - Dr. Jim Hendon
 Milton Ross - Detective Bryan
 Lola May - Edna
 Louise Brownell - Miss Miller

References

External links

1916 films
American silent feature films
American black-and-white films
1916 drama films
Silent American drama films
Films directed by Scott Sidney
1910s American films